The FNH Patrol Bolt Rifle is a bolt-action tactical rifle produced by Fabrique Nationale de Herstal. It is chambered in the standard 7.62×51mm NATO (.308) cartridge.

Manufacturer
The FN Herstal PBR (Patrol Bolt Rifle) is manufactured and distributed by FN Herstal USA, the United States division of the armament company. The design is based on the Winchester Model 70 and is available in 18", 20", 22" or 24" barrel lengths. Additionally, a 16" and 18" barrel is available with a recoil reducer. It features a specially designed FN/Hogue stock with a full-length aluminum bedding block, featuring a cold rotary forged medium heavy barrel with recessed crown and a four groove, right hand, 1 in 12 twist rate. It utilizes a removable magazine with four round capacity.

All models are chambered for 7.62×51mm NATO caliber.

External links
 Information on the PBR tactical rifle at SniperCentral, accessed 21 May 2009

References

7.62×51mm NATO rifles
Bolt-action rifles of Belgium
Patrol Bolt Rifle